Mollinedia ruae is a species of plant in the Monimiaceae family. It is found in Honduras and Nicaragua.

References

ruae
Flora of Honduras
Flora of Nicaragua
Critically endangered flora of North America
Taxonomy articles created by Polbot